"I'm Famous" is a song by British YouTuber Marcus Butler and British singer Conor Maynard. It was released in the United Kingdom as a digital download on 22 January 2016. on 22 January 2016. The single was a minor success on the UK Singles Chart reaching number 85 for one week. The music video of the song has been released onto Marcus Butler's YouTube channel. The music video for the song has nearly 5 million views.

Composition
"I'm Famous" was written by Marcus himself and Brett McLaughlin, who wrote and sang chorus part of Marcus's previous song "I'm a Rapper".
This song features British singer Conor Maynard, who has number 1 album and 5 Top 10 songs in the UK during 2012 and 2013.

Credits and Personnel 
 Marcus Butler – songwriting, vocals
 Brett McLaughlin – songwriting
 Conor Maynard – vocals

Chart performance

Weekly charts

Release history

References

External links
 
 Full lyrics of this song at Musixmatch

2016 songs
2016 singles
Conor Maynard songs
Songs written by Leland (musician)